Declan Joseph Oliver Donnelly  (born 25 September 1975) is a British television presenter, television producer, former singer, rapper, comedian and actor from Newcastle upon Tyne, England. He is best known for working alongside Ant McPartlin as part of the presenting duo Ant & Dec.

Donnelly came to prominence, alongside McPartlin, in the children's drama series Byker Grove, with both men establishing successful careers as television presenters, in which they are most known for presenting SMTV Live (between 1998–2001), I'm a Celebrity...Get Me Out of Here! and Ant & Dec's Saturday Night Takeaway (since 2002), and Britain's Got Talent (since 2007).

Other notable highlights of Donnelly's career alongside McPartlin include presenting PokerFace, Push the Button, Pop Idol, and Red or Black?, being hosts of charity appeal Text Santa (between 2011 and 2014), and also performing as pop music duo PJ & Duncan.

Early life
Donnelly is the child of parents Alphonsus Donnelly and Anne Donnelly, who originally resided in Desertmartin, Northern Ireland before moving to England in the 1950s, settling in Newcastle upon Tyne. He is among seven children the couple raised within the council estate of Cruddas Park.

Donnelly's education took place first at St Michael's Roman Catholic Primary School, and later at the all-boys St Cuthbert's High School, with him receiving 8 GCSEs. Although he eventually moved towards a career in television, he originally considered becoming a Catholic priest but changed his mind upon seeing the students from the all-girls Sacred Heart Catholic High School.

Career

Donnelly's career in television began at the age of 12, when his father suggested that he audition for Byker Grove, a new children's television programme being created by CBBC in Newcastle upon Tyne that had been advertised in local newspapers. His success in this audition led to him securing the role of Duncan, whereupon he first met Anthony McPartlin. Although he was raised in an estate close to Donnelly, McPartlin had never met him until their involvement in the children's drama. The pair worked together on the show until their eventual departure in 1993, whereupon they began to bond as friends, both socially and professionally.

After a short tenure in music, Donnelly and McPartlin furthered their careers in television by becoming the presenting duo Ant & Dec. Having already fronted Children's TV show 'The Ant and Dec show' on BBC1, which ran for 2 series, followed by a stint on Channel 4 with the edgier 'Ant & Dec Unzipped', The pair continued to work in children's television, fronting ITV's saturday morning children's programme SMTV Live. After leaving the programme in 2001, the pair branched out to front other shows, including game shows – Friends Like These, PokerFace and Push the Button – talent shows – Pop Idol, and Britain's Got Talent – and entertainment programmes – I'm a Celebrity... Get Me Out of Here!, and Ant & Dec's Saturday Night Takeaway. The pair continued to maintain acting careers, starring in a tribute to The Likely Lads in 2002, in the form of a remake of an episode from the show's sequel Whatever Happened to the Likely Lads?, entitled "No Hiding Place", and in 2006 film Alien Autopsy.

Ant & Dec have their own production company Mitre Television where they produce their shows.

Personal life

On 22 July 2006, Donnelly was the best man for McPartlin's wedding to Lisa Armstrong.

In August 2011, Donnelly attended his father's funeral, after Alphonsus died in hospital of cancer.

Donnelly dated actress Clare Buckfield for ten years between 1993 and 2003, and television presenter Georgie Thompson from January 2009 until April 2011. On 13 November 2014, Donnelly became engaged to the duo's manager Ali Astall, with whom he had been in a relationship for over a year, with the marriage taking place at St Michael's Roman Catholic Church, Elswick, Tyne and Wear, on 1 August 2015. The ceremony was conducted by his brother, Father Dermott Donnelly, a Catholic priest, with McPartlin as his best man. On 1 September 2018, after announcing earlier in the year that the couple were expecting their first child, Donnelly's wife gave birth to a daughter, whom the couple revealed had been named as Isla Elizabeth Anne.

On 19 March 2018, after his colleague McPartlin's car crash, it was announced that Donnelly would be presenting the remaining episodes of Ant & Dec's Saturday Night Takeaway and the live semi-finals of Britain's Got Talent on his own.

In November 2019, it was revealed that Dec is a distant cousin of the American pro wrestling promoter Dixie Carter. His elder brother Dermott died after a short illness on 8 July 2022 at age 55.

Donnelly has stated that he is a practising Roman Catholic but does not publicly discuss religion or his family in depth.

On 23 July 2022, Donnelly and Astall welcomed their second child Jack Anthony Alphonsus Donnelly, whose middle names were chosen in tribute to his grandfathers.

Charity
Donnelly and McPartlin are patrons of the charity Sunshine Fund. When their single 'Let's Get Ready to Rhumble' reached No.1 in 2012, Ant & Dec donated the single's success to the charity ChildLine. They also support the Text Santa appeal.

Donnelly also supports the Diocese of Hexham and Newcastle's Youth Ministry Team, directed by one of his older brothers, Dermott Donnelly, former dean of St Mary's Cathedral in Newcastle. They opened the W4 Youth Centre in 2013.

Earnings
In 2007, Donnelly and McPartlin signed a 2½ year, £30 million contract with ITV.

He had an estimated net worth of around £64 million in 2018.

Honours and awards
Donnelly was appointed an Officer of the Order of the British Empire (OBE) in the 2016 Birthday Honours for services to broadcasting and entertainment.

The following listed below are the television awards that Donnelly has been nominated for or awarded with, primarily while working alongside Anthony McPartlin as Ant & Dec:

1994
Brit Award Nomination – Best Song: "Let's Get Ready to Rhumble"

1995
Brit Award Nomination – British Breakthrough
Royal Television Society Awards- The Ant and Dec Show

1996
British Academy Children's Awards: Children's Entertainment Show (The Ant and Dec Show)

1997
Nominated – British Academy Children's Awards: Children's Entertainment Show (The Ant and Dec Show)

1998
British Academy Children's Awards: Children's Entertainment Show (Ant and Dec Unzipped)

2000
British Academy Children's Awards: Children's Entertainment Show (SMTV Live)
TV Choice Awards: Best Children's Show (SMTV Live)
Royal Television Society Awards: Best Children's Entertainment Programme (SMTV Live)
TV Hits Awards: Best Teen Show (CD:UK)
Loaded Carling Good Work Fellas Awards: Best Double Act
British Comedy Awards: The People's Choice (SMTV Live)

2001
TV Choice Awards: Best Children's Show (SMTV Live)
Broadcast Awards: Best Children's Programme (SMTV Live)
Royal Television Society Awards : Best Television Presenters
Disney Channel Awards: Kids Awards (The Ant and Dec Show)
Nominated – British Academy Children's Awards: Best Children's Entertainment Show (SMTV Live)

2002
Nominated – British Academy Television Awards: Entertainment Performance (Pop Idol)
British Academy Children's Awards: Children's Entertainment Show (SMTV Live)

2005
Nominated – British Academy Television Awards: Entertainment Performance (I'm a Celebrity... Get Me Out of Here!)

2006
British Comedy Awards: Best Comedy Entertainment Personality
British Comedy Awards: Best Comedy Entertainment Programme

2007
Nominated – British Academy Television Awards: Entertainment Performance (Ant & Dec's Saturday Night Takeaway)

2008
TV Quick & TV Choice Awards: Best Entertainment Show (Saturday Night Takeaway)
Nickelodeon UK Kids Choice Awards 2008: Favourite Funny Person, Best TV presenters and Best Family TV show (Britain's Got Talent)

2009
TV Quick & TV Choice Awards: Best Entertainment Show (Ant & Dec's Saturday Night Takeaway)
TV Quick & TV Choice Awards:Outstanding Contribution Award
Nominated – British Academy Television Awards: Entertainment Performance (I'm a Celebrity... Get Me Out of Here!)

2010
British Academy Television Awards: Entertainment Performance (I'm a Celebrity... Get Me Out of Here!)
British Academy Television Awards: Entertainment Programme (Britain's Got Talent)

2012
Freesat: Best TV Presenter(s)

2013
TRIC Awards: TV Personality of the Year
TRIC Awards: TRIC Special Award (I'm a Celebrity... Get Me Out of Here!)
RTS Awards: Entertainment Performance (I'm a Celebrity... Get Me Out of Here!)
Nominated – British Academy Television Awards: Entertainment Performance (I'm a Celebrity... Get Me Out of Here!)

2014
British Academy Television Awards: Entertainment Performance (Ant & Dec's Saturday Night Takeaway)
British Academy Television Awards: Entertainment Programme (Ant & Dec's Saturday Night Takeaway)

2015
British Academy Television Awards: Entertainment Performance (Ant & Dec's Saturday Night Takeaway)
British Academy Television Awards: Entertainment Programme (Ant & Dec's Saturday Night Takeaway)

2017
British Academy Television Awards: Entertainment Programme (Ant & Dec's Saturday Night Takeaway)
British Academy Television Awards: Live Event (The Queen's 90th Birthday Celebration)

2018
British Academy Television Awards: Entertainment Programme (Britain's Got Talent)

2019
Guinness World Records: Most NTA's for Best Presenter won consecutively at 18
British Academy Television Awards: Entertainment Programme (Britain's Got Talent)
British Academy Television Awards: Reality And Constructed Factual Programme (I'm A Celebrity... Get Me Out Of Here!)

National Television Awards

Filmography

Television

Film

Television advertisements

Apps
An official Saturday Night Takeaway app known as Studio Rush launched on 30 January 2013 but has been removed.
An official I'm a Celebrity, Get Me Out of Here! app launched on 9 November 2015.

References

External links

Cult of Ant&Dec HQ
ITV biography
Official Ant and Dec website

1975 births
Ant & Dec
Best Entertainment Performance BAFTA Award (television) winners
British male television actors
British male child actors
British people of Northern Ireland descent
British Roman Catholics
British television presenters
Living people
Officers of the Order of the British Empire
People educated at St. Cuthbert's School
Male actors from Newcastle upon Tyne
Musicians from Newcastle upon Tyne